Persatuan Sepakbola Selayar Kepulauan (simply known as PSSK Selayar) is an Indonesian football club based in Selayar Islands Regency, South Sulawesi. They currently compete in the Liga 3.

History
PSSK Selayar was established in July 1962, the establishment of the club was spearheaded by sportsmen in Benteng, Selayar Islands under the name Persatuan Sepakbola Selajar Kepulauan or PSSK for short. Their goal is to become a member of PSSI and develop soccer organizations located in the level area of Selayar II. Selayar Islands Regency is a district established under Law no. 29 of 1959 concerning the Establishment of Level II Regions in Sulawesi. Selayar Regency wants to change its name to Selayar Maritime Regency. However, in Law no. 17 of 1985, does not recognize a "maritime state", but an "archipelagic state". Therefore, Selayar Regency was renamed Selayar Islands Regency. Along with the implementation of the Indonesian Spelling System from Van Ophuijsen Spelling System, the word Selajar was changed to Selayar and had implications for PSSK's long name, namely Persatuan Sepakbola Selayar Islands.

References

External links

Sport in South Sulawesi
Football clubs in Indonesia
Football clubs in South Sulawesi
Association football clubs established in 1962
1962 establishments in Indonesia